The Universe Made of Darkness is the second studio album by Tesla Boy.

Track listing

References

2013 albums
Tesla Boy albums